The Communications Machine, or "CM", is a mechanical device used by the United States Navy for the most of the 1920s.  It used a sliding alphabet system. It was developed by Agnes Meyer Driscoll and William Gresham. In 1937 the United States Congress recognized the achievement of these two by awarding them both $15,000.

References 

Encryption devices